Clepsis luctuosana is a species of moth of the family Tortricidae. It is found in Central Asia (the Tian Shan mountains) and China (Xinjiang).

References

Moths described in 1914
Clepsis